Kostadin Dzhambazov (Bulgarian Cyrillic: Костадин Джамбазов; born 6 July 1980 in Burgas) is a former Bulgarian footballer, who played as a defender.

External links
 2006–07 Statistics at PFL.bg
 

Bulgarian footballers
PFC Slavia Sofia players
PFC Litex Lovech players
FC Chernomorets Burgas players
Neftochimic Burgas players
Khazar Lankaran FK players
PFC Nesebar players
First Professional Football League (Bulgaria) players
1980 births
Living people
Association football defenders
Bulgarian expatriate footballers
Bulgarian expatriate sportspeople in Azerbaijan
Expatriate footballers in Azerbaijan